Peter John Bodak (born 12 August 1961) is an English former footballer who played as a winger.

Career
Born in Birmingham, Bodak was a product of the Coventry City youth system and helped them reach the League Cup semi-finals in 1980–81. He transferred to Manchester United in July 1982, but was there for just five months before joining rivals Manchester City without having played for United's first team. At the end of the season, he moved to Hong Kong to play for Seiko, followed by another move to Belgium with Royal Antwerp a year later.

He returned to England with Crewe Alexandra in December 1986, followed by a move to Swansea City in March 1988, where he scored four goals in 31 league appearances, as well as featuring in their 1987–88 Fourth Division play-off final triumph. At the end of the 1988–89 season, he moved back to Hong Kong with Happy Valley.

He subsequently played for Walsall, Sutton Coldfield Town and Atherstone United.

References

1961 births
Living people
Footballers from Birmingham, West Midlands
English footballers
Coventry City F.C. players
Manchester United F.C. players
Manchester City F.C. players
Seiko SA players
Royal Antwerp F.C. players
Crewe Alexandra F.C. players
Swansea City A.F.C. players
Walsall F.C. players
Sutton Coldfield Town F.C. players
Expatriate footballers in Belgium
Belgian Pro League players
Hong Kong First Division League players
Expatriate footballers in Hong Kong
Association football midfielders
English expatriate sportspeople in Hong Kong
English expatriate footballers